Jann Bangert (born 20 April 1997) is a German footballer who plays as a forward for SV Rot-Weiß Hadamar.

References

External links
 

1997 births
People from Weilburg
Sportspeople from Giessen (region)
Footballers from Hesse
21st-century German people
Living people
German footballers
Association football forwards
SV Wehen Wiesbaden players
TSV Schott Mainz players
FC Gießen players
3. Liga players
Regionalliga players
Oberliga (football) players